Nguyễn Thị Thị (born 15 June 1983) is a Vietnamese rower. She competed in the women's lightweight double sculls event at the 2004 Summer Olympics.

References

External links
 

1983 births
Living people
Vietnamese female rowers
Olympic rowers of Vietnam
Rowers at the 2004 Summer Olympics
Sportspeople from Hanoi
21st-century Vietnamese women